Cinnamon bush lark may refer to:

 Flappet lark, a species of lark found in Africa
 Horsfield's bush lark, a species of lark found in Australia and Southeast Asia